Erhard Mayke (born January 6, 1896 West Prussia -1962) Was a German speed skater and competed at the 1928 Winter Olympics hosted in St moritz Switzerland, he also competed in the World Allround Speed Skating Championships for Men in the same year 1928 hosted in Davos. Career personal bests were: 500 – 48.4 (1928); 1500 – 2:37.6 (1928), 5000 – 9:20.0 (1928); 10000 – 19:01.6 (1928). Also having a second appearance at the Olympics 1936 in Germany where he was one of the timekeepers in speed skating.

Background and family 
Following his birth in 1896 the family lived in a town called Konitz in Poland, they then moved to live in Berlin in 1900. Settling there for the long term, living in Schöneberg in Spichan Strasse. His Father studied garden design and started to work from Berlin it was preferential because of its more central location. Erhard was married twice. Though his long term wife was Luise Placke, from  Osnabrück.

During 1st and 2nd World War 
He was a soldier of the cavalry in the Prussian army. He loved horses, wounded in 1916 when he was 20, during the 1st world war nearly losing his left arm. Always then having a hole in the left shoulder he worked after the war in a coffee roasting shop.

References

1896 births
1962 deaths
German male speed skaters
Olympic speed skaters of Germany
Speed skaters at the 1928 Winter Olympics